Starlight Over Texas is a 1938 American Western film directed by Albert Herman and written by John Rathmell. The film stars Tex Ritter in his first film for Monogram Pictures, Carmen Laroux, Rosa Turich, Karl Hackett, Horace Murphy and Snub Pollard. The film was released on September 7, 1938, by Monogram Pictures.

Plot

Cast          
Tex Ritter as Tex Newman
Carmen Laroux as Rosita Ruiz
Rosa Turich as Maria 
Karl Hackett as Kildare 
Horace Murphy as Ananias
Snub Pollard as Pee Wee
Charles King as Hank Boston 
Martin Garralaga as Captain Gomez
George Chesebro as Ashley Hill
Carlos Villarías as Governor Ruiz
Ed Cassidy as Captain Brooks 
Salvatore Damino as Ramon Ruiz

References

External links
 

1938 films
American Western (genre) films
1938 Western (genre) films
Monogram Pictures films
Films directed by Albert Herman
American black-and-white films
1930s English-language films
1930s American films